Elisabeth Lier Haugseth (born 1961) is a Norwegian lawyer and civil servant.

She served as the deputy Gender Equality and Anti-Discrimination Ombud until 2016, the Consumer Ombud of Norway from 2016 to 2018 and then (following the reorganization of the Ombud's office) as the director-general of the Norwegian Consumer Council from 2018 to 2020. From 2020 she is a director-general in the Ministry of Culture and Equality, where she heads the Department for Equality, Non-Discrimination and International Affairs.

Haugseth graduated with the cand.jur. degree at the University of Oslo in 2000, and was a deputy judge and an associate in the law firm of Wiersholm before her career in the civil service.

References

1961 births
Living people
University of Oslo alumni
Norwegian jurists
Directors of government agencies of Norway
Ombudsmen in Norway